Hazel Greene-Pereira (born 19 January 1960) is an Irish three time archer for Ireland in the Summer Olympic Games, powerlifter and fencer.

Early life 

She was born in Ballingarry and is the youngest of three children. Greene and her family moved to Naas when she was eight. She is a great-niece of Richard Greene. After leaving school in 1978 she took up archery.

Archery 

In 1979 she set five Irish records at the Kildare Open Championships. Greene qualified for the Summer Olympic Games in 1980, 1984 and 1988. She finished nineteenth, twentieth and 38th respectively.

Powerlifting 

She won in her age group and weight division at the World Association of Benchpress and Deadlifting World Championships in 1997. She lifted 315 lb (143 kg) setting a WABDL record that lasted for two years.

Fencing 

In 2005 she began fencing and came sixth in the épée in the Veterans age group at the United States Fencing Association National Championships in 2007.

References

External links 
 Profile on worldarchery.org

1960 births
Living people
Irish female archers
Olympic archers of the Republic of Ireland
Archers at the 1980 Summer Olympics
Archers at the 1984 Summer Olympics
Archers at the 1988 Summer Olympics
Irish powerlifters
Irish female épée fencers